The Leibniz harmonic triangle is a triangular arrangement of unit fractions in which the outermost diagonals consist of the reciprocals of the row numbers and each inner cell is the cell diagonally above and to the left minus the cell to the left.

Values
The first eight rows are:

Terms 
The terms are given by the recurrences

and explicitly by

where  is a binomial coefficient.

Relation to Pascal's triangle
Whereas each entry in Pascal's triangle is the sum of the two entries in the above row, each entry in the Leibniz triangle is the sum of the two entries in the row below it.  For example, in the 5th row, the entry (1/30) is the sum of the two (1/60)s in the 6th row.

Just as Pascal's triangle can be computed by using binomial coefficients, so can Leibniz's: . Furthermore, the entries of this triangle can be computed from Pascal's: "The terms in each row are the initial term divided by the corresponding Pascal triangle entries."  In fact, each diagonal relates to corresponding Pascal Triangle diagonals: The first Leibniz diagonal consists of 1/(1x natural numbers), the second of 1/(2x triangular numbers), the third of 1/(3x tetrahedral numbers) and so on.

Infinite series 
The infinite sum of all the terms in any diagonal equals the first term in the previous diagonal, that is  because the recurrence can be used to telescope the series as  where .

For example,

Replacing the formula for the coefficients we get the infinite series , the first example given here appeared originally on work of Leibniz around 1694

Properties 
If one takes the denominators of the nth row and adds them, then the result will equal . For example, for the 3rd row, we have 3 + 6 + 3 = 12 = 3 × 22.

We have

See also 

 Pascal's rule
 Hockey-stick identity

References

Triangles of numbers
Gottfried Wilhelm Leibniz